Tamphana praecipua is a moth in the Bombycidae family. It was described by Schaus in 1905. It is found in French Guiana.

References

Natural History Museum Lepidoptera generic names catalog

Bombycidae
Moths described in 1905